KRI Teluk Karimata (960) is a dry cargo support ship of the Indonesian Navy.

Development and design 
KRI Teluk Karimata is a Hungarian Tisza-class coastal cargo ship, the design of which is based on the Soviet Keyla class. The ship is powered by a MAN 5-cylinders diesel engine, with total power output of  distributed in one shaft.

The ship is a cargo coaster ship with a dead weight of 1,828 tonnes has the main task of being a logistics transport ship in its duties as a supporting element of military sea transportation. This ship has three spacious cargo holds and also equipped with six cranes for loading and unloading cargo.

She also able to transport 250 fully-equipped troops. The ship is armed with two 12.7 mm heavy machine guns in 2M-7 twin mounts, located on the port and starboard side of the ship. In addition, it is equipped with individual weapons in the form of the Soviet-made AK-47.

Construction and career 
Teluk Karimata was built in 1964 by Angyalföld Unit of Hungarian Shipyard & Crane Factory in Budapest, Hungary. The vessel was commissioned on 18 March 1965  (Kolinlamil / Military Sealift Command).

Referring to her history, the ship was brought in related to the preparation for Operation Trikora in the 1960s. Judging from the year of her arrival, the ship was sent to Indonesia after Operation Trikora was concluded, due to a peace agreement with the Dutch over Papua.

Throughout her service, the ship has contributed to the nation and state in carrying out operational tasks, both in war military operations and military operations other than war as well as other service operations, including the 2004 Tsunami Social Assistance Operation in Aceh.

She also participated in the 2013 Rakata Jaya Operation in the Sulawesi region and Expeditionary Operations. Unitary State of the Republic of Indonesia in 2014 in the East Nusa Tenggara region.

In July 2014, the ship in the waters of the Java Sea had held a skilled test exercise, including anti-air, anti-surface, the role of passing through minefields, damage control, overboard rescue, in addition to that, her equipments were also tested in readiness of the software faced with operating tasks according to its basic function.

The ship carried out a combat capability test of his crew during their voyage in Karimun Jawa waters to Jakarta after supporting the shift of materials and troops from the Special Forces Command (Kopassus) in the context of the Expeditionary Operation of the Republic of Indonesia (NKRI) to the East, Wednesday 1 April 2015.

On Saturday, 7 May 2016, the ship was docked at the Indonesian Navy Base Pondok Dayung, Tanjung Priok, North Jakarta, experienced a fire that caused extensive damage. Tho the ship in the incident did not burn out. She had a list due to the great amount of water being sprayed from the PT Pelindo II tugboats as a procedure to extinguish the flames. She was later decommissioned later that year on 15 August.

On 17 November 2017, she was towed out to sea off Bali as a target ship for other Indonesian Navy vessels. Her fate was sealed after the ship was torpedoed and sunk on the 27th of the same month. She served as a target for C-705 missiles from KRI Clurit and KRI Kujang, as well as torpedoes from the submarine KRI Nanggala.

Gallery

References

 
 

Ships built in Hungary
1964 ships
Auxiliary ships of the Indonesian Navy